The following is a list of cast members who have portrayed characters appearing in 20th Century Fox's X-Men film series, based upon the Marvel Comics superhero team of the same name and its related characters.

The first three films in the series are X-Men (2000), X2 (2003), and X-Men: The Last Stand (2006), starring Hugh Jackman as Logan / Wolverine, Patrick Stewart as Charles Xavier / Professor X, Ian McKellen as Erik Lehnsherr / Magneto, Famke Janssen as Jean Grey, Halle Berry as Storm, Anna Paquin as Rogue, James Marsden as Scott Summers / Cyclops, Shawn Ashmore as Bobby Drake / Iceman, and Rebecca Romijn as Raven Darkhölme / Mystique. Daniel Cudmore portrays Piotr Rasputin / Colossus in the last two films, while Elliot Page and Kelsey Grammer star as Kitty Pryde and Hank McCoy / Beast, respectively, in the latter. Jackman also stars in a trilogy of films centered on Wolverine, consisting of X-Men Origins: Wolverine (2009), The Wolverine (2013), and Logan (2017), where he is joined by Stewart as Xavier.

James McAvoy, Michael Fassbender, Jennifer Lawrence, and Nicholas Hoult star in X-Men: First Class (2011) as younger versions of Xavier, Lehnsherr, Darkhölme, and McCoy, respectively, while Lucas Till appears as Alex Summers / Havok. X-Men: Days of Future Past (2014) features both the original cast (except for Romijn) and the new actors, while also introducing Evan Peters as Peter Maximoff / Quicksilver. McAvoy, Fassbender, Lawrence, Hoult, Till, and Peters reprise their roles in X-Men: Apocalypse (2016), where Sophie Turner, Tye Sheridan, Kodi Smit-McPhee, and Alexandra Shipp portray younger versions of Grey, Scott Summers, Kurt Wagner / Nightcrawler, and Storm. Except for Till, all new actors return in Dark Phoenix (2019).

Ryan Reynolds portrays Wade Wilson / Deadpool in X-Men Origins: Wolverine and stars as a new version of the character in Deadpool (2016), which also features a new version of Colossus played by Stefan Kapičić, replacing Cudmore. Reynolds reprises his role in the short film No Good Deed (2017), and in Deadpool 2 (2018), in which Kapičić also reprises his role. Maisie Williams, Anya Taylor-Joy, Charlie Heaton, Blu Hunt, and Henry Zaga star as  the titular team members Rahne Sinclair, Illyana Rasputin, Samuel Guthrie, Danielle Moonstar, and Roberto da Costa in The New Mutants (2020).

Stewart, Jackman, and Reynolds reprise their respective roles in the Marvel Cinematic Universe (MCU) media franchise.

Cast and characters

Notes

References

External links 

Lists of actors by film series
Lists of actors by role
Films cast members
Films cast members